Uprising Records is a record label founded in 1994 by Sean Muttaqi. It has released records by Fall Out Boy, 7 Angels 7 Plagues,  Cipher, Red Knife Lottery, Underminded, Amir Sulaiman, iCON the Mic King, The Crest and more. The label released the mini-LP Fall Out Boy's Evening Out with Your Girlfriend, which has gone on to sell over 127,000 copies in the United States.

Roster

Current artists
 Amir Sulaiman
 The Crest
 Dylan DillinJah
 Gloria
 Her Demise, My Rise
 I Am the Ocean
 iCON the Mic King
 Katsumoto
 Red Knife Lottery
 Underminded
 Vegan Reich

Alumni
 Fall Out Boy
 Her Demise My Rise
 Carnifex
 Kid Gorgeous 
 My Bitter End
 Nehemiah
 Project Rocket
 Racetraitor
 Ricanstruction
 7 Angels 7 Plagues
 Culture
 This Moment
 Dr. Acula
 Broadway
 Emmure
 Liferuiner
 Cipher
 T. Mills
 Stretch Armstrong
 Eyes Upon Separation
 Tension

See also
 List of record labels

References

Punk record labels
Hip hop record labels
Reggae record labels
Heavy metal record labels
Record labels established in 1994